Barbara Jane Bennett (August 13, 1906 – August 8, 1958) was an American stage and film actress and dancer.

Family

Born in Palisades Park, New Jersey, Barbara Bennett was the second of three daughters born to actor Richard Bennett and his wife, actress Adrienne Morrison. Her maternal grandfather was the stage actor Lewis Morrison.  Her older sister Constance and her younger sister Joan had successful film careers. The girls attended the Chapin School with the actress Jane Wyatt.

Personal life
Bennett married three times and had five children. On January 28, 1929, she married tenor Morton Downey. The couple had four biological children, including son Morton Downey Jr., and adopted a fifth child, Michael. They divorced in June 1941. Bennett later married actor Addison Randall, a popular romantic star and singing cowboy at the time. On July 16, 1945, Randall died after suffering a myocardial infarction and falling from a horse during the filming of The Royal Mounted Rides Again. Bennett married Laurent Suprenant in 1954. The couple moved to Montreal in 1957 and remained together until her death the following year.

Bennett later worked as a literary representative for producer Walter Wanger, who was married to her sister Joan. In that position, Bennett scouted best-sellers and the like as potential movie properties, especially for her sister Joan.

Death
On August 8, 1958, five days before her 52nd birthday, Bennett died after what the media described as an unidentified "long illness" in Montreal. Over the course of her life, Bennett attempted suicide four times. As the circumstances surrounding herself were vague and Bennett's sister Joan refused to discuss the details of her death, rumors arose that Bennett had finally succeeded in ending her life. In her 1982 memoirs Lulu In Hollywood, longtime friend and actress Louise Brooks wrote of Bennett, "Barbara made a career of her emotions. Periods of work or marriage were terminated by her frightening, abandoned laughter of despair and failure. Only her death, in 1958, achieved in her fifth suicide attempt, could be termed a success."

She was buried at Burtonville Union Cemetery in Lacolle, Quebec. A memorial service was later held at the Church of the Good Shepherd in Beverly Hills.

Broadway credits

Filmography

References

Sources

External links
 
 
 
 Portrait of Bennett by Nickolas Muray

1906 births
1958 suicides
20th-century American actresses
Actresses from New Jersey
American expatriates in Canada
American female dancers
Dancers from New Jersey
American people of English descent
American people of Jewish descent
American people of Spanish descent
American film actresses
American silent film actresses
American stage actresses
Burials in Quebec
People from Palisades Park, New Jersey
Suicides in Quebec
Chapin School (Manhattan) alumni
20th-century American dancers
1958 deaths